The Islamic Azad University, Sabzevar Branch was founded in 1985 in Sabzevar, the second largest city in the Khorasan province in the north east of Iran. Located at the center of a largely agricultural region, Sabzevar has a population of around two hundred thousands, mainly engaged in commerce and small industry.

Courses and degrees

 Food science and technology (B.Sc., M.Sc., Ph.D..)
 Persian Literature (B.A., M.A, PhD..)
 Islamic philosophy (M.A)
 Islamic jurisprudence (B.A)
 Accounting (B.A.)
 Electronics (B.Sc.)
 Biomedical Engineering (B.Sc.)
 Nursing (B.Nurs.)
 Education (B.A.)
 Public health (HND.)
 Computer Engineering (HND, B.SC.)
 Economics (B.SC.)
 Educational management (B.SC.)
 Carpet design and production (HND)

See also
 Hakim Sabzevari University

Notes

Buildings and structures in Razavi Khorasan Province
Education in Sabzevar County
Educational institutions established in 1985
Sabzevar, Islamic Azad University of
1985 establishments in Iran